Anisophyllea ferruginea is a tree of Borneo in the family Anisophylleaceae. The specific epithet  is from the Latin meaning "rust-coloured", referring to the leaf hairs.

Description
The bark is smooth to cracking or fissured.

Distribution and habitat
Anisophyllea ferruginea is endemic to Borneo. Its habitat is mixed dipterocarp forest from sea-level to  altitude.

References

ferruginea
Trees of Borneo
Endemic flora of Borneo
Plants described in 1958
Taxonomy articles created by Polbot
Flora of the Borneo lowland rain forests